Robert Parker  (born 4 December 1987, Cheltenham) is a British water polo player. At the 2012 Summer Olympics, he competed for the Great Britain men's national water polo team in the men's event. He is 6 ft 6 inches tall. He was the top goal scorer for Team GB with 8 goals in the London Olympics.

References

British male water polo players
1987 births
Living people
Olympic water polo players of Great Britain
Water polo players at the 2012 Summer Olympics
sportspeople from Cheltenham